Beatrice Agyeman Abbey is a Ghanaian Chief Executive Officer and General manager of Media General who are owners of TV3, Onua FM, 3FM, Connect FM, Akoma FM and MG Digital. In 2021, she was awarded as the Outstanding Broadcast Media CEO of the Year in the Ghana Entrepreneur and Corporate Executive Awards.

Education 
Beatrice obtained both her bachelor's degree and master's degree from GIMPA.

Career 
Beatrice started her career in 2000 as a reporter, then a Broadcast Journalist and News Anchor. In 2017, she became the General Manager for the Media General. She was the Head of the Media General Digital for over a year and General Manager of Media General Radio for sometime. She has interviewed notable persons such as John Agyekum Kufuor, John Mahama, and Ellen Johnson Sirleaf. She has worked with major news houses such as BBC, Sky TV, Citizen TV, CNN, VOA,  and Kiss TV in Kenya.

Awards 
In September 2020, she was awarded for Excellence in Media at the Ghana Women of the Year. It was organized by Glitz Africa.

In May 2021, she was awarded as the Outstanding Broadcast Media CEO of the Year in the Ghana Entrepreneur and Corporate Executive Awards. It was organized by the Entrepreneurs Foundation of Ghana (EFG)

References 

Ghanaian chief executives
Living people
Ghanaian radio presenters
Ghanaian women radio presenters
Ghanaian television presenters
Ghanaian journalists
Ghanaian women journalists
Year of birth missing (living people)
Ghanaian business executives
Place of birth missing (living people)
Ghana Institute of Management and Public Administration alumni